The EuroLeague All-Final Four Team, or FIBA SuproLeague All-Final Four Team, was an award given by Europe's premier level league, the EuroLeague, to the top five basketball players of each season's EuroLeague Final Four competition. The EuroLeague Final Four MVP, was selected among the five players of the EuroLeague All-Final Four Team. The award existed during the era in which the EuroLeague was organized by FIBA Europe. It was given for the last time by the FIBA SuproLeague, during the 2000–01 season's FIBA SuproLeague Final Four. After the Euroleague Basketball Company took over control of the EuroLeague, the award was no longer given out, and was replaced by the All-EuroLeague Team award, which was an award for the competition's whole season, up until the EuroLeague Final Four stage.

EuroLeague All-Final Four Team (1991–2001)

Players with multiple EuroLeague All-Final Four Team selections
The following table only lists players with at least two total EuroLeague All-Final Four Team selections.

See also
All-Euroleague Team
EuroLeague Final Four MVP
EuroLeague Final Four
EuroLeague Awards
EuroLeague Finals
EuroLeague

Notes

References

External links
 EuroLeague Official Web Page
 Linguasport SuproLeague
 InterBasket EuroLeague Basketball Forum
 Eurohoops EuroLeague Archives
 TalkBasket EuroLeague Basketball Forum
 

Final Four All-Team